The Xumi Fushou Temple is one of the Eight Outer Temples in Chengde, Hebei, China. This Buddhist temple is in the north of the park complex of the Chengde Mountain Resort, to the east of Putuo Zongcheng Temple on the north side of a slightly upward slope hill.

History 
The temple was first designed in 1780 to celebrate the 70th birthday of the Qianlong Emperor. It was built for Penchen Lama the VI who came to Chengde from Tibet to convey his congratulations and is a fusion of Chinese and Tibetan architectural style.

Structures
Its main building, the Great Red Terrace (Dahongtai), has three stories, and was furthermore built on a three-story foundation. The Miaogaozhuangyan Hall where the Panchen Lama preached is the center of the temple. The Jixiangfaxi Hall with a roof made of gold plated copper tiles was the home of Penchen Lama. Other buildings are the seven-story octagonal Liuli-Wanshou pagoda (琉璃万寿塔 "Glazed Tile Pagoda of Longevity") and a glazed tile paifang. In the stele pavilion of the temple is a memorial plaque with stone engraving in Manchu, Chinese, Mongolian and Tibetan script, with an inscription in memory of events.

Paleontology 
From 1979 and into the 1980s, the Eight Outer Temples and Chengde Mountain Resort were renovated using local stone slabs. Since 1992, fossilized dinosaur tracks in the rock slabs have been reported from Hebei and the surrounding area. Over 40 tracks were found at Xumi Fushou Temple, in front of the front door and behind the páilóu.

References 

Chengde
Churches completed in 1780
Buddhist temples in Hebei
Gelug monasteries and temples
Major National Historical and Cultural Sites in Hebei